aka Yuko's White Breasts and High School Girl Report: Yūko's White Breasts is a 1971 Japanese film in Nikkatsu's Roman porno series, directed by Yukihiko Kondo and starring Yūko Katagiri.

Synopsis
Yuko is an innocent high school girl who has a crush on her gym teacher. She and her friends have a sleep-over party which develops into a sexual dare-game involving eels, and a lesbian orgy. Now sexually-awakened, Yuko decides to seduce her teacher, but is raped in an elevator before she meets her teacher.

Cast
 Yūko Katagiri: Herself
 Emiko Yamagishi: Maki
 Koji Satomi: Ishida
 Ranko Morita: Yūko's sister
 Kōji Kai: Hanamura
 Ei Shirai: Senior
 Kunio Shimizu: Laundry owner
 Kenji Shimamura: Middle-aged man
 Akira Takahashi: Chauffeur

Background
Coed Report: Yuko's White Breasts was released theatrically in Japan on December 1, 1971 as part of the second Roman Porno double-bill. Along with Castle Orgies (1971)-- one of Nikkatsu's first two releases-- Coed Report: Yuko's White Breasts was the subject of "Japan: Ancient and Modern", a feature in the March 1973 issue of the British journal Continental Film Review.

Popular Nikkatsu Roman Porno actress Yūko Katagiri's first role, Coed Report: Yuko's White Breasts established the young and innocent image for which the actress became known. It also established Nikkatsu's practise of debuting new actresses in films in which they played a character bearing their own stage name. In their Japanese Cinema Encyclopedia: The Sex Films, the Weissers judge Coed Report: Yuko's White Breasts to be one of actress Yūko Katagiri's better films. They write that the actress was, "surprisingly fresh in the role, perhaps overly pubescent, considering the rather lurid subject matter." The character Katagiri played made her popular with Roman Porno audiences. Katagiri later tried to expand her acting range with more mature roles, such as Masaru Konuma's Secret Wife (1973).

Bibliography

English

Japanese

Notes

1971 films
1970s Japanese-language films
Nikkatsu films
Nikkatsu Roman Porno
1970s Japanese films